Motu One, which means "Sand Island" in various Polynesian languages, refers to several islands throughout Polynesia, including:
Motu One (Marquesas Islands)
Motu One (Society Islands)
Motu One, off the island of Tubuai